Zulfiqar Khan or Nusrat Jung born as Muhammad Ismail in 1657 was the first Nawab of the Tamil Carnatic State. He was the son of Asad Khan, a Wazir of the Mughal Emperor Aurangzeb and his wife Mehrunnisa (daughter of Asaf Khan IV). He was married to the daughter of Bengal governor Shaista Khan. He was the wazir of the emperor Jahandar Shah.

Services in the Mughal Army

Capture of Raigarh
Muhammad Ismail was with the Emperor Aurangzeb during the 30-year-long Deccan Wars with the Sultanates of Golconda and Bijapur and the Marathas. He was sent by the emperor against the Maratha stronghold of Raigarh against Raja Ram Bhonsle. But the widow of Sambhaji, Yesubai and her minister Ramchandra Bavdekar Pant Amatya sent young Raja Ram Bhonsle to the stronghold of Pratapgarh through Kavlya ghat from where he escaped to the fort of Jinji in present-day state of Tamil Nadu arriving on 1 November 1689. Muhammad Ismail was given the title Itikad Khan and sent along with the naval commander Siddi Qasim Yaqut Khan besieged Raigarh in March 1689 till 19 October 1689 when Yesubai and her minister Ramchandra Bavdekar Pant Amatya  surrendered on the promise that Itikad Khan swear on the Quran that he would protect Yesubai and Shahu II against any cruelty.

On the capture of Raigarh all that remained of Shivaji's treasure, all the records of the Maratha government, the royal horses and elephants with their state trappings, and the golden throne made by the great king for his coronation, fell into Itikad Khan's hands. Yesubai was also captured and Itikad Khan was made her personal assistant during her detention. As a reward for this splendid success Itikad Khan was given the title of Zulfiqar Khan and ordered to reduce Panhala Fort. Siddi Qasim Yaqut Khan was rewarded by the grant of the Ratnagiri districts of Anjanvel and Sindhudurg.

Siege of Jinji and Governorship of Hyderabad-Karnataka
The Maratha commandant of Panhala Fort was Ghatge of Kagal. He surrendered to Zulfiqar Khan in April 1690. Zulfiqar Khan was now sent on the most enduring task of his and the Mughal Empire's legacy in South India, to besiege Jinji Fort. In the first siege of the fort from 1690-1695 CE. he along with his father Asad Khan and Prince Muhammad Kam Bakhsh failed to capture the fort. Disagreement with the young prince and the mutiny of the Mughal artillery were the reasons for the failure of the siege on top of the Maratha insurgency. Zulfiqar Khan settled the matter with an armistice and moved some troops to Madras with himself moving to Vandavasi. There he found refuge and a new ally in the British East India Company. Fort St. George's Governor Elihu Yale (the founder of Yale University in the United States), helped in all possible ways in return obtains a kaul from Vizier Asad Khan confirming the existing grants for the factories of Madras, Masulipatnam, Madapollam, Vizagapatam, Fort St. David, Cuddalore, and Porto Novo and making new grants of Egmore, Purasawalkam and Tondiarpet. But when Zulfiqar Khan requested 100,000 pagodas from the Madras Council, Nathaniel Higginson (first Mayor of Madras) sent a present, but declined to lend the sum asked. An attack on Madras is feared by the English from Zulfiqar Khan but Emperor Aurangzeb sends Zulfiqar Khan reinforcements and commands him to renew the siege of Jinji without further delay and not to waste time with the English.

When Qasim Khan, Subedar of Bijapur-Karnatak was bringing supplies to Vandavasi he was intercepted by Santa Ghorpade near Kaveripakkam. Qasim Khan took shelter behind its walls. Zulfiqar Khan, hearing of his straits, marched to his relief and escorted him safely to Vandavasi. Santa baulked of his prey, attacked and took a number of forts with their Mughal garrisons, Zulfiqar Khan at once turned back, retook the forts and entering Thanjavur took from Shahu, Vyanko's son, a large indemnity. Returning northwards, he led out his army from Vandavasi and renewed the siege of Jinji. Unable to cope with Zulfiqar Khan's military skill and the large forces at his disposal, Santa Ghorpade entered the southern province of Bijapur.

The second siege of Jinji Fort began in 1695 and lasted till 1698 CE. Santa Ghorpade while in Bijapur had defeated Qasim Khan and Himmat Khan and was tempted to try once more to relieve Jinji, but Zulfiqar Khan went out in person to meet him and severely defeated him some miles to the north of Jinji. Santa realized that with Zulfiqar Khan in sole command of the investing army, it was impossible to raise the siege. By 1697 it had become a blockade and little blood was shed save when Zulfiqar Khan's second in command, Daud Khan Panni, from time to time got drunk and senselessly assaulted the Maratha outposts. Nevertheless, the blockade was a strict one and no supplies entered the beleaguered town. Raja Ram Bhonsle realized he could no longer hold out and escaped one night to Vellore. Harji Mahadik's son took command of the garrison. But the vigor of Zulfiqar Khan's attacks soon afterwards carried the outer walls. In January 1698, Daud Khan came by chance to learn of a path through a small wood up the side of the fortress. Sober for the moment, he examined it and without informing Zulfiqar Khan, decided to storm it. He joined with him in the enterprise a Rajput chief called Rao Dalpat Bundela. The garrison thought the assault to be only one of Daud Khan Panni's drunken outbreaks and paid little heed to it, until Dalpat Rao had carried the main defenses. The garrison fled to the citadel. But the Mughal forces now entered the town on all sides and the citadel surrendered to Zulfiqar Khan. As he had previously promised to do, he handed over Raja Ram's wives and their two sons to the Shirkes, who arranged for their return to the western Deccan. So ended the great siege of Jinji in January 1698.  The escape of Raja Ram from Jinji angered Emperor Alamgir who now determined to crush the Marathas began to lay sieges of various Maratha forts from 1698 onwards. But for Zulfiqar Khan's successes and his continued resolve and determination in holding onto Eastern Deccan, Emperor Aurangzeb gave him the added title of Nusrat Jung.

Battle of Godavari River

Raja Ram had taken with him a large force to attack Jalna. His march was at first successful. He plundered the city and then set it on fire. Entering the Godavari valley, he plundered Paithan, Bhid and other towns along the river banks. Fearing to penetrate further east he turned back, meaning to deposit his plunder within the walls of Sinhagarh. He had no sooner turned than he was surprised and defeated by Zulfiqar Khan. Zulfiqar Khan had in a series of skillfully fought actions worsted repeatedly Dhanaji Jadhav and had driven the Maratha troops out of south-eastern India. He then hastened north-west and inflicted on Raja Ram's army, a severe reverse. The regent fell back with all speed, but he never shook off the Mughal pursuit. In this disastrous retreat the regent's resource and courage alone saved his army. Although half dead with fatigue, he fought for fifty miles a continuous series of rear-guard actions, and at last brought his command, reduced but not destroyed, to the welcome shelter of Sinhagad. Unhappily, the hardships and exposure aggravated a weakness of Raja Ram's lungs contracted at Jinji, He at first seemed in good spirits at the fortunate end of his enterprise, received modestly the congratulations of Ramchandra Bavdekar and the other ministers. But after some days high fever set in with frequent hemorrhages. Raja Ram died of an unspecified illness in 1700 at fort Sinhagad in present-day Maharashtra. Thereafter the Marathas suffered a power vacuum until the release of his nephew, Shahu II in 1707. In the interim, Raja Ram's wife, Tarabai ruled the empire as regent for her young son, Shiva II. Eventually, Shahu II son of Sambhaji succeeded Raja Ram in 1708 after a civil war.

Siege of Wagingera
During the final Siege of Wagingera Emperor Aurangzeb Alamgir sent for Zulfiqar Khan Nusrat Jung who arrived on 27 March, and next day attacked Lal Tikri hillock which was lost to the Berads in the early days of the siege and retook it. The Berads retreated to the village at the foot of Talwargera and began firing their muskets from behind its mud wall. Many Rajputs fell in this daring attack. But Zulfiqar Khan Nusrat Jung did not stop there. He sent Rao Dalpat Bundela to another mound which was taken and the Berads fled to the village of Dhedpura.  On this day, 21 bullets and 1 rocket hit Rao Dalpat Bundela's elephant while the banners of Zulfiqar Khan Nusrat Jung were full of shot holes from the Berad musket fire. But Zulfiqar Khan Nusrat Jung held his position. A few days afterwards Zulfiqar Khan Nusrat Jung made a strategic move and captured the wells from where the Berads used to draw their water. He attacked Talwargera on 27 April taking the village after slaughtering all the Berads. With the arrival of Zulfiqar Khan Nusrat Jung the Berads were now hard pressed. The siege weapons were pushed forward to the fort, and on the day appointed for the assault, Emperor Alamgir mounted his horse to take part therein, and took his position at a cannon-shot distance from the fort.  The enemy was overpowered, and some positions were captured. Being greatly dispirited, Pedda Pidia Nayak, commander of the fort, placed two or three thousand musketeers to hold one of the gates to the last. He then directed his people to take their wives and children, their jewels, and whatever they could carry, and after setting fire to the temple and other buildings, they went out from another gate, and by some outlets which had been prepared for such an occasion, they made their way to the Maratha army, in parties, in the dark of night. They then fled with the Marathas. The conflagration in the fort and the cessation of the firing made the Mughals aware of their flight. A party of men entered, and found only disabled and wounded persons who were unable to fly. On the 14th Muharram, the Imperial forces took possession of the place after a siege of three months.  The name Wagingera was changed to Fort Rahman Bakhsh. The Imperial army then retired to pass the rainy season at Deogaon, three or four kos from the River Krishna.

A plaque embedded on the wall to the entrance of the fort reads in Persian;
 – signifying the fall of the fort in 1705.

By now the elderly Emperor was exhausted and returned to Ahmednagar on 31 January 1706. The siege of Wagingera would be his last battle. He died in 1707 and was succeeded by his son Bahadur Shah I.

Amir-ul-Umara of Mughal Empire & Governorship of Deccan
Zulfiqar Khan Nusrat Jung was made Amir-ul-Umara or Noble of Nobles under the new regime along with the Subahdari of the government of Deccan and in Karnatak was placed his second in command Daud Khan Panni.

Grand Vizier of Mughal Empire & Execution
It was with Zulfiqar Khan's aid and intrigues that Jahandar Shah after the death of his father Bahadur Shah I, overcame all his brothers and ascended the throne of Delhi when he was appointed as Vizir-e-Azam or Prime Minister.  Zulfiqar Khan was the first prime minister of the Mughal Empire to have more power in the government of the empire than any Emperor since the early years of the reign of Akbar.

After the defeat of Jahandar Shah in the battle against Farrukhsiyar, he was taken up and strangled by order of the latter as a punishment for his conduct. His head together with that of the late emperor Jahandar Shah, were carried on poles and their bodies hanging feet upwards across an elephant were exposed in the new emperor's train when he made his triumphant entry to the palace at Delhi. This event took place in January 1713 CE. His aged father, Asad Khan, was compelled to attend the procession accompanied by the ladies of his family as spectators of their own disgrace. It was Asad Khan who in hopes of making peace with the new emperor had persuaded his son to visit him and had thus put him in his power. With tears in his eyes, he wrote the following epitaph on his son's death:

See also
Siege of Raigarh (1689)

Sources

See also
Nawabs of Arcot

Mughal generals
Mughal Empire people
Mughal Subahdars
Mughal Empire
Mughal nobility
Indian Muslims
Nawabs of the Carnatic
1657 births
1713 deaths
Grand viziers of the Mughal Empire